is a city on the northern border of Ōita Prefecture in Kyushu, Japan. The city is on the border with Fukuoka Prefecture. Nakatsu was founded on April 20, 1929. As of March 2017, the city has an estimated population of 84,701 and a population density of 170 people per km2. The total area is 491.09 km2.

History
1587: Kuroda Yoshitaka (Josui) built Nakatsu Castle as a flatland castle near the Yamaguni River.
April 1925: The village of Ōe was merged with Toyoda to become the town of Nakatsu. 
April 1919: The village of Ogusu and the town of Nakatsu were merged to become the city of Nakatsu.
August 1933: The villages of Tsurui, Ōhata and Josui were merged into Nakatsu. 
April 1951:  The village of Miho was merged into Nakatsu.
October 1954: The village of Wada was merged into Nakatsu.
February 1955: The village of Imazu was merged into Nakatsu.
March, 2005: The towns of Hon'yabakei, Yabakei and Yamakuni, and the village of Sankō (all from Shimoge District) were all merged into Nakatsu.

Geography
Nakatsu is in the northwest corner of Ōita Prefecture, Kyushu. To the east of Nakatsu is Usa and to the southwest is Hita. Nakatsu touches the border of Fukuoka Prefecture on its west. To the northeast is the Suohnada Sea. The city covers an area of 491.09 square kilometers, 80% of which is mountainous. There is a wide stretch of flat, agricultural land which begins at the mouth of Yamakuni River and extends to Mount Hiko called the Nakatsu plain.

Climate
Nakatsu has a humid subtropical climate (Köppen climate classification Cfa) with hot summers and cool winters. Precipitation is significant throughout the year, but is somewhat lower in winter.

Demographics
Per Japanese census data, the population of Nakatsu in 2020 is 82,863 people. Nakatsu has been conducting censuses since 1920.

Tourism
Nakatsu is a castle town centered on Nakatsu Castle, which is open to visitors. The modernised interior comprises a museum with samurai armor, old maps and information about Rangaku (Dutch studies), for which Nakatsu was an important center in the Edo period. There are views from the top of the castle keep. 

Visitors can see the residence of the most celebrated member of the Okudaira clan of Nakatsu, Fukuzawa Yukichi, and the memorial hall there. It is close to the castle and a 15-minute walk from the station. 

Nakatsu's Mt. Hachimen was home to the popular music festival, Concert on the Rock.

Notable people from Nakatsu

 Yoshijirō Umezu
 Fukuzawa Yukichi
 Fuyumi Ono
 Mai Matsumuro
 Risa Honda

See also
 Nakatsu Domain
 James Murdoch, author of the famous History of Japan who taught briefly in Nakatsu junior high school (1893)

References

 Nakatsushi-shi kankokai (Hrsg.): Nakatsu-shi (History of Nakatsu). Nakatsu: Nakatsushi-shi kankōkai, 1965.
 Kuroya Naofusa: Nakatsuhan-shi (History of the Nakatsu Clan). Tōkyō: Kokusho kankōkai, 1987.

External links

 
 

 
Cities in Ōita Prefecture
Port settlements in Japan
Populated coastal places in Japan